Marc López and Rafael Nadal were the defending champions, but Nadal decided not to participate this year. López played alongside Marcel Granollers, but lost in the second round to Alexander Peya and Bruno Soares.

Bob and Mike Bryan won the title, defeating Treat Conrad Huey and Jerzy Janowicz 6–3, 3–6, [10–6] in the final. With the win, the Bryan brothers became the first team to achieve all nine ATP Masters 1000 events.

Seeds

Draw

Finals

Top half

Bottom half

References
Main Draw

BNP Paribas Open - Men's Doubles
2013 BNP Paribas Open